Patton is a surname. Notable people with the surname include:

Military
George S. Patton (1885–1945), American general
George Patton IV (1923–2004), son of George S. Patton and also a U.S. Army general
George Smith Patton (attorney)
George S. Patton, Sr. (1833–1864), Confederate colonel and grandfather of George S. Patton
Raymond Stanton Patton (1882–1937), American admiral and engineer, second Director of the United States Coast and Geodetic Survey
Waller T. Patton (1835–1863), Confederate lieutenant colonel and great-uncle of George S. Patton

Politics
Barbara Patton (born 1944), New York politician and university professor
Charles Emory Patton (1859–1937), U.S. Congressman from Pennsylvania
E. Earl Patton (1927–2011), Georgia state senator from 1969 to 1970
Henry D. Patton (–1966), New York assemblyman 1914
James Patton (Lieutenant Governor), Lieutenant Governor of Mississippi from 1820 to 1822
John Patton (Detroit mayor) (1822–1900)
John Patton (1823–1897), U.S. Congressman from Pennsylvania
John Patton, Jr. (1850–1907), U.S. Senator from Michigan
John Denniston Patton (1829–1904), U.S. Congressman from Pennsylvania
John Mercer Patton (1797–1858), U.S. Congressman from Virginia
Paul E. Patton (born 1937), Governor of Kentucky from 1995 to 2003
Robert M. Patton (1809–1885), Governor of Alabama from 1865 to 1868

Academia
Elizabeth Patton, FRSE  professor of chemical genetics, Personal Chair in Melanoma Genetics and Drug Discovery, MRC Human Genetics Unit, Edinburgh
Francis L. Patton (1843–1932), 12th President of Princeton University
Carl Patton, former president of Georgia State University
Paul R. Patton (born 1950), Professor of Philosophy at the University of New South Wales
James L. Patton (born 1941), Professor of Integrative Biology at UC Berkeley

Arts
Big Boi, or "Antwan André Patton" (born 1975), hip hop artist
Bill Patton (1894–1951), American actor
Candice Patton (born 1985), American actress

Charley Patton (1891–1934), U.S. blues musician
Chris Patton (born 1971), American actor
Conro, or "Conor Patton", Canadian music producer
Fiona Patton (born 1962), Canadian fantasy author
John Patton (musician), Hammond organ player
Mike Patton (born 1968), American musician
Ashlyn Gere, or "Kimberly Patton" (born 1959), adult actress
Paula Patton (born 1975), American actress
Donovan Patton (born 1978), American actor and voice actor
Virginia Patton (1925–2022), American actress

Sports
Arthur Patton (1916-1990), Australian rugby league footballer
Bill Patton (baseball) (1912–1986), American baseball player
Debbie Patton, American bodybuilder
Casey Patton (born 1974), Canadian retired boxer
Darvis Patton (born 1977), American Olympic sprinter
Jimmy Patton (born 1933-1971, American Football Player NFL NY GIANTS
Jonathon Patton (born 1992), Australian rules footballer
Joshua Patton (born 1997), American basketball player in the Israeli Basketball Premier League
 Justin Patton (born 1997), American basketball player for Hapoel Eilat of the Israeli Basketball Premier League
Mel Patton (1924–2014), American Olympic sprinter
Mike Patton (rugby league), New Zealand rugger
Quinton Patton (born 1990), American football player
Spencer Patton (born 1988), American professional baseball player
Steve Patton, American football coach
Troy Patton (born 1985), American baseball pitcher

Other
Carl Patton (born 1949), American serial killer
James Patton (Virginia colonist) {1692-155), Irish immigrant to colonial Virginia
Henry Patton (1867–1943), Irish bishop
James French Patton (1843–1882), American lawyer
Michael Quinn Patton (born 1945), U.S. organizer and consultant
William Hampton Patton (1853–1918), American entomologist
Paul Patton, secret identity of comic book character The Fox